Pinus cembra, also known as Swiss pine, Swiss stone pine or Arolla pine or Austrian stone pine or just stone pine, is a species of a pine tree in the subgenus Strobus.

Description 
The Swiss pine is a member of the white pine group, Pinus subgenus Strobus, and like all members of that group, the leaves ('needles') are in fascicles (bundles) of five, with a deciduous sheath. However, it grows very slowly and it may take 30 years for the tree to reach . Cones take 2 years (24 months) to mature. The species is long-lasting and can reach an age between 500 and 1000 years.

In its natural environment, this tree usually reaches reproductive maturity at the age of 50 years (if the conditions are more extreme, even 80 years). 

The very similar Siberian pine (Pinus sibirica) is treated as a variety or subspecies of Swiss pine by some botanists. The Siberian pine differs in having slightly larger cones, being more massive (taller, wider trunk), having a faster growth rate and needles with three resin canals instead of two as in the Swiss pine.

Distribution and habitat 
The Swiss pine grows in the Alps and Carpathian Mountains of central Europe, in Poland (Tatra Mountains), Switzerland, France, Italy, Austria, Germany, Slovenia, Slovakia (Tatra Mountains), Ukraine and Romania. It often reaches the alpine tree line in this area.

Ecology 
Swiss pine associates with numerous species of mycorrhizal fungi from a young age, usually from the genus Suillus. This symbiosis improves the tree's growth and survival rate.

Uses
Swiss pine is a popular ornamental tree in parks and large gardens, giving steady though not fast growth on a wide range of sites where the climate is cold. It is very tolerant of severe winter cold, hardy down to at least , and also of wind exposure. The seeds are also harvested and sold as pine nuts. When cultivated, it will likely start producing cones after the age of 12 years, much faster than in the wild. This depends on the climate, soil type, mycorrhizal fungi etc. To make the tree bear cones faster, the tree can be inoculated with ectomycorrhizal fungi, such as Suillus luteus, Suillus americanus, Suillus placidus etc. These are the most effective. 

Pine cones cut into slices are used to flavor schnapps, which is then sold as "Zirbenschnaps" or "Zirbeler" schnapps.

The wood is the most used for carvings in Val Gardena since the 17th century.

The cone of the Swiss pine was the field sign of the Roman legion stationed in Rhaetia in 15 BC, and hence it is used as the heraldic charge (known as Zirbelnuss in German) in the coat of arms of the city of Augsburg, the site of the Roman fort Augusta Vindelicorum.

It is also a species that is often used in bonsai.

Pinus cembra can be found in the uppermost forest belt where it helps to minimize the risk of avalanches and soil erosion. Due to this ability, the tree is valued as a stabilizing factor for afforestation projects at high elevations.

Like other European and Asian white pines, Swiss pine is very resistant to white pine blister rust (Cronartium ribicola). This fungal disease was accidentally introduced from Europe into North America, where it has caused severe mortality in the American native white pines in many areas, notably, Western white pine and the closely related whitebark pine. Swiss pine is of great value for research into hybridization to develop rust resistance in these species.

References

External links 

 Pinus cembra cone pic (scroll to bottom of page)
 Photos of Pinus cembra in Switzerland
 Link to Joanneum Research Study
 Folder Joanneum Research: Stone Pine - Positive health effects of Stone Pine furniture
 Pinus cembra - distribution map, genetic conservation units and related resources. European Forest Genetic Resources Programme (EUFORGEN)

Edible nuts and seeds
Flora of Poland
Least concern plants
Cembra
Plants described in 1753
Taxa named by Carl Linnaeus
Trees of Europe
Flora of France
Flora of the Alps
Flora of the Carpathians